The Roy Hesketh Circuit was a racing circuit located on the outskirts of Pietermaritzburg in KwaZulu-Natal. It was named after South African racing driver Roy Hesketh, who died in the Second World War. Doug Aldridge, Colin Dove, Ossie Fisher, George Finch and George Shrives got together as a Consortium from Pietermaritzburg in the early nineteen fifties to first build and then maintain and improve the circuit.

During its period of operation (1953-1981) it hosted rounds of the South African National Drivers Championship, and national Formula Atlantic races. The circuit also hosted the Easter races - a festival of racing over three days.  Mike Hailwood, Giacomo Agostini,  Barry Sheene, Kork Ballington, Jim Redman, Paddy Driver, Alan North, Mike Grant, Rod Gray and Syd Stacy were regular competitors at the circuit as were John Love, Jackie Pretorius, Sam Tingle, Jody Scheckter and brother Ian Scheckter.

In 1973 the South African government banned all motorsport due to the world oil crisis, the circuit went into decline and finally closed in 1981 after only 28 years.

The Stock Car Dust Bowl 

Stock Car racing started at the Dust Bowl Circuit in the mid 60s and was very successful, it created a new style of racing in the area bringing stock car drivers from as far afield as Dundee and Durban. Miles Crerar founded the Pietermarizburg Stockcar and Speedway Supporters Club. Most drivers were local, such as Clive and Nigel Owen, Alyn Woodley, Allan Hoy, Colin Clarke, Llew Futter, Gareth Bailey, Margaret Tyrer, Witty Boast, Bunny Dique, Lez Bromfield and Chris Currey.  

The sport went into decline in the late 70s and the circuit closed for good in 1981.

Dirt Bike Speedway
Dave Hiron an ex UK speedway rider and hard working secretary for stock car and motorcycle dirt racing arranged motorcycle racing on the
stock car track. Dave Hiron was seriously injured when accidentally run down by a rider while officiating, after a long recovery period worked tirelessly behind the scenes to make dirt bikes a success in the 1970s. 
Riders of that time include: S.A. champion, Les Smith, Eddie English, Arthur Arpin and the Bergstrom brothers.

Karting 
Blackie Blackman, John White, Neville Flint and Alf Ford and many other raced at the Karting track built on the inside of the main racing circuit. Arthur Eggar won the Natal Championship in 1976 and awarded the Natal Colours.

Post Closure 
Motor racing in Pietermaritzburg gradually decreased after the closing of the track in 1981. The track is now being used for advanced driver training and track days. 

In January 2004 the circuit was sold to the Roy Hesketh Motor Racing Foundation for R 3,250,000. Strict development conditions were attached to the sale. 

In 2009 Bunker Racing started at the circuit. 2010 the circuit was closed to all motor racing after several civil protests against the noise.
In 2013 the property was put up for sale for R 1.5 million due to the Roy Hesketh Motor Racing Foundation defaulting on the previous sale conditions.

Pre Roy Hesketh Circuit 

This 3.4 mile Alexandra Park Street Circuit was established in 1948 on streets within the town of Pietermaritzburg. Races were held until 1953 when the Roy Hesketh Circuit was built.

See also
South African Springbok Championship Series

References

External links 
Roy Hesketh Motor Racing Programme Covers 1953-1979 
Syd Van der Vyver South African Driver’s Champion in 1960 and 1961
Roy Hesketh Circuit
Races Results 1953 - 1981
Roy Hesketh Circuit Heritage - Motorcycle Pictorial History 1953 - 1981 - Book

Stock car racing
Motorsport venues in South Africa
Defunct sports venues in South Africa
Defunct motorsport venues
Sports venues in KwaZulu-Natal
Sports venues completed in 1953